
The following is a list of stadiums in the United States. They are ranked by capacity, which is the maximum number of spectators the stadium can normally accommodate. All U.S. stadiums with a current capacity of 10,000 or more are included in the list. The majority of these stadiums are used for American football, either in college football or the NFL. Most of the others are Major League Baseball ballparks or Major League Soccer stadiums.

Rows shaded in yellow indicates stadium is home to an NFL, MLB, MLS, or NWSL franchises.

See also
List of American football stadiums by capacity
List of U.S. baseball stadiums by capacity
List of soccer stadiums in the United States
List of NCAA Division I baseball venues
List of NCAA Division I FBS football stadiums
List of NCAA Division I FCS football stadiums
List of North American stadiums by capacity
List of stadiums by capacity
List of indoor arenas in the United States

References

Lists of stadiums
Capacity
Lists of sports venues with capacity